Ansonia malayana is a species of toad in the family Bufonidae. It is also known as Malayan slender toad, Malaya stream toad, and pigmy false toad. It is found on the Malay Peninsula, from the Kra Isthmus (Thailand) southward to Peninsular Malaysia. However, its precise distribution in Thailand is poorly known as it may have been confused with Ansonia kraensis, described as a new species in 2005; it may also represent more than one species.

Description
Ansonia malayana males measure  and females  in snout–vent length or slightly more. Tympanum is distinct. Dorsum has small round warts and tubercles and is dark brown in colour, with greenish yellow marks, an interrupted light interorbital chevron, a light interscapular spot, and an interrupted light dorsolateral arc. Limbs have yellowish crossbars. Sides of head and body have small yellow spots.

Habitat
Its natural habitats are lowland and montane tropical moist forests. It breeds in streams (where the tadpole develop), and adults are often found in boulder crevices and leaf-litter in streams. It is found at altitudes between 300 and 1,300 m. It is potentially threatened by habitat loss.

References

malayana
Amphibians of Malaysia
Amphibians of Thailand
Amphibians described in 1960
Taxa named by Robert F. Inger
Taxonomy articles created by Polbot